Rosalba Cimino (born 1 March 1990) is an Italian politician from the Five Star Movement. She has been a member of the Chamber of Deputies since 2018.

See also 

 List of members of the Italian Chamber of Deputies, 2018–

References 

Living people
1990 births
Deputies of Legislature XVIII of Italy
21st-century Italian politicians
21st-century Italian women politicians
People from Agrigento
Five Star Movement politicians
Women members of the Chamber of Deputies (Italy)